Lozova may refer to:

 Lozova, a city in the Kharkiv Oblast, Ukraine
 Lozova, Strășeni, a commune in Strășeni district, Moldova
 Lozova, a village in Braniștea Commune, Galați County, Romania
 Lozova (river), a river in Galați County, Romania